Bethlehem Steel Football Club (1907–1930) was one of the most successful early American soccer clubs. Known as the Bethlehem Football Club from 1907 until 1915 when it became the Bethlehem Steel Football Club, the team was sponsored by the Bethlehem Steel corporation.  Bethlehem Steel FC played their home games first at East End Field in Bethlehem, Pennsylvania, in the Lehigh Valley, then later on the grounds Bethlehem Steel built on Elizabeth Ave named Bethlehem Steel Athletic Field.

History

The first soccer ball came to Bethlehem in 1904, according to a June 2, 1925, article in The Bethlehem Globe. The sport took hold of the town and local steel workers formed a recreational team. On November 17, 1907, the Bethlehem Football Club played its first official match, an 11–2 loss to West Hudson A.A., at the time one of the top professional teams in the country. In 1913 the steel company created Bethlehem Steel Athletic Field, the country's first soccer field with stadium-seating. In 1914 Charles Schwab, owner of the Steel Company, took the team professional, using his wealth to induce several top players to move to Bethlehem Steel and changing the team name to the Bethlehem Steel Football Club. Schwab would eventually begin importing players from Scotland and England. From 1911 to 1915, the club was a member of the amateur Allied American Foot Ball Association before moving to the American Soccer League of Philadelphia, another amateur league, for the 1915–1916 season.

Bethlehem Steel was not associated with a league from 1916 to 1917, playing only exhibition or cup games. In 1917, it joined the professional National Association Foot Ball League. In 1921, several teams from the NAFBL and other regional leagues joined together to form the American Soccer League. Although one of the strongest teams of the time, the owners decided to disband the club, moving the players and management to Philadelphia where it competed as the Philadelphia Field Club. Legendary Scottish football player Alex Jackson, played for Bethlehem Steel. Although Philadelphia won the first ASL championship, the team was in financial trouble and lacked fan support. The ownership moved it back to Bethlehem the next year taking back their old name.

In 1925, Bethlehem, and the rest of the ASL, boycotted the National Challenge Cup. While this created some animosity with the United States Football Association, no serious ramification resulted. However, in 1928, the ASL again boycotted the Challenge Cup. When Bethlehem Steel chose to ignore the boycott, the league expelled them. Under the leadership of the USFA, Bethlehem Steel and two other expelled teams joined with teams from the Southern New York State Soccer Association to create the Eastern Soccer League. These actions, part of the 1928–1929 "Soccer Wars", along with the Great Depression, financially devastated the ASL, ESL and Bethlehem Steel FC. While Bethlehem Steel FC rejoined the ASL in 1929, the damage was done and the team folded after the spring 1930 season.

Year-by-year

Honors
 League Champion
 Winner (9): 1913, 1914, 1915, 1919, 1920, 1921, 1927, 1929, Fall 1929
 Runner Up (5): 1916, 1918, 1923, 1924, 1925
 National Challenge Cup
 Winner (5): 1915, 1916, 1918, 1919, 1926
 Runner Up (1): 1917
 American Cup
 Winner (6): 1914, 1916, 1917, 1918, 1919, 1924
 Runner Up (1): 1920
 Lewis Cup
 Winner (1): 1928
 Allied Amateur Cup
 Winner (1): 1914
 Runner Up (1): 1912
 National Association Football League
 Winner (3): 1918–19, 1919–20, 1920–21
 Runner Up (1):1917–18
 American Soccer League
 Winner (1): 1926–27 
 Runner Up (3):1922–23, 1923–24, 1924–25

Famous players 
 Archibald McPherson Stark: World Record holder of the Highest Season Scoring Record (67 goals, 1924/25 season)

Coaches
Harry Trend: 1909
Carpenter: 1913
Jimmy Lawson: 1914
William Sheridan:  ?–1924
Jimmy Easton: 1924–
William Sheridan: 1930

References

External links

History of Bethlehem Steel F.C. by Dan Morrison.
The Rise and Fall of the Bethlehem Steel Football Club by Julian Brown

1907 establishments in Pennsylvania
1930 disestablishments in Pennsylvania
American Soccer League (1921–1933) teams
Association football clubs established in 1907
Association football clubs disestablished in 1930
Defunct soccer clubs in Pennsylvania
Eastern Professional Soccer League (1928–29) teams
National Association Football League teams
Soccer clubs in Pennsylvania
Sports in Bethlehem, Pennsylvania
U.S. Open Cup winners
Works soccer clubs in the United States